Jason Forbach is an American actor and singer. He has played Rapunzel's Prince and the Baker in Into the Woods, Raoul, Vicomte de Chagny in The Phantom of the Opera, and Enjolras and Feuilly in Les Misérables.

Career
In 2006, Forbach joined the Las Vegas cast of The Phantom of the Opera understudying the roles of Raoul and Monsieur Reyer.

In 2009, Forbach played the dual role of Rapunzel's Prince and The Wolf in Into the Woods at the Wells Fargo Pavilion.

In 2012, Forbach joined the 25th Anniversary national tour cast of Les Misérables as Feuilly and an understudy for Enjolras. He later took over the role of Enjolras playing opposite his partner Joseph Spieldenner as Grantaire.

In March 2014, Forbach returned to Les Misérables in the Broadway revival. Once again playing Feuilly and understudying Enjolras. He briefly took over the role of Enjolras again in October 2014 and left the production in November of that same year. In June 2015, he returned to the production playing Feuilly and the Factory Foreman.

In 2022, Forbach joined the New York City Center Encores! production of Into the Woods as the male swing. He would end up going on for Rapunzel's Prince for a majority of the run. He moved with the production to the St. James Theatre for the 2022 Broadway revival understudying the roles of the Baker, the Wolf/Cinderella's Prince, Rapunzel's Prince, and the Narrator/Mysterious Man. He opened the production as the Baker when Brian d'Arcy James was sick, and also went on for the Princes and Wolf many times during the production's run on Broadway.

On November 21, 2022, Forbach returned to The Phantom of the Opera at the Majestic Theatre for a limited run through December 5 playing the role of Raoul. He had been a vacation swing in Phantom at the Majestic Theatre for several years, primarily understudying the roles of Raoul, Reyer, Marksman, and Hairdresser.

In 2023, Forbach went on tour across the United States to ten cities with the Broadway production of Into the Woods playing Rapunzel's Prince and understudying the Baker. He starred opposite Gavin Creel, Stephanie J. Block, Montego Glover, and Sebastian Arcelus all reprising their Broadway roles. On February 23, he went on for the Baker last second for the second act of the production's preview performance at the Kennedy Center in Washington D.C., he would then proceed to open the show's engagement as the Baker that weekend and play the role for the majority of the performances at the Kennedy Center while Arcelus was recovering from an injury. Andy Karl and understudies Sam Simahk and Eddie Lopez played Rapunzel's Prince in his place. On February 28, Forbach announced on his Instagram stories he’d be playing the Baker during the 6 day absence of Arcelus at the Emerson Colonial Theatre in Boston, Massachusetts. Simahk played Rapunzel’s Prince in his place.

Acting credits

Theatre 
Source:

References

External links
Jason Forbach's Instagram
Jason Forbach on IDBD

American male stage actors
Year of birth missing (living people)
Living people
21st-century American male actors